Before the Acts of Union 1707, the barons of the sheriffdom of Edinburgh (also called "Edinburgh principal" to distinguish it from "Edinburgh within the constabulary of Haddington", and now known as Midlothian) elected commissioners to represent them in the Parliament of Scotland and in the Convention of the Estates. The number of commissioners was increased from two to four in 1690.

After the Union, Edinburghshire returned one Member of Parliament to the House of Commons of Great Britain and later to the House of Commons of the United Kingdom.

List of shire commissioners
 1594: James Foulis of Colinton

Sources
 Return of Members of Parliament (1878), Part II.
 Joseph Foster, Members of Parliament, Scotland (1882). 
 The Records of the Parliaments of Scotland.

References

See also
 List of constituencies in the Parliament of Scotland at the time of the Union

Constituencies disestablished in 1707
Shires represented in the Parliament of Scotland (to 1707)
History of Midlothian
Politics of Midlothian
1707 disestablishments in Scotland